Radius of curvature, the reciprocal of the curvature in differential geometry
 Minimum railway curve radius, the shortest allowable design radius for the centerline of railway tracks